George William Howlan (May 19, 1835 – May 11, 1901) was an Irish-born merchant, ship owner and political figure in Prince Edward Island.

He represented 1st Prince in the Legislative Assembly of Prince Edward Island from 1863 to 1873 as a Liberal member. He represented Alberton division in the Senate of Canada from 1873 to 1894 and was the province's sixth Lieutenant Governor from 1894 to 1899.

He was born in Wexford and came to Nova Scotia with his parents in the late 1830s. They settled in Prince Edward Island in 1839. Howlan was educated in Charlottetown and was hired as a clerk in a store there in 1850. He moved to Cascumpec (later Alberton), first working for a Boston merchant there and then setting up his own business. In 1866, he married Elizabeth Olson. Howlan was named to the Executive Council in 1867, serving until 1873. However, in 1870, he threw his support behind the Conservatives after Protestants in the Liberal caucus refused to support separate schools. Howlan initially opposed Confederation, believing that the island would have little say. However, he supported railway building in the province and the resulting debt load forced the island to reconsider union with Canada. In 1873, he was named customs collector at Charlottetown.

In 1873, Howlan ran unsuccessfully for a seat in the House of Commons but was named to the Senate that same year. He married Mary E. Doran in 1881 after the death of his first wife. Howlan resigned from his seat in the Senate in 1891 to run unsuccessfully for a seat in the House of Commons but was appointed again to the Senate later that year. Also in 1891, he went to England as a representative of the province to discuss with engineers there the feasibility of a tunnel connecting the island to the mainland. Howlan died in Charlottetown in 1901.

References 
Biography at the Dictionary of Canadian Biography Online
 
Lieutenant-Governor Gallery, Prince Edward Island

1835 births
1901 deaths
Irish emigrants to pre-Confederation Prince Edward Island
Prince Edward Island Liberal Party MLAs
Canadian senators from Prince Edward Island
Lieutenant Governors of Prince Edward Island
People from Alberton, Prince Edward Island
Politicians from County Waterford